Nitrocyclohexane is an organic compound with the molecular formula C6H11NO2. It is a colorless liquid, but degraded samples appear pale yellow.

Preparation
It is prepared by reaction of nitrogen dioxide with cyclohexane.  Cyclohexane is a convenient substrate because all twelve C-H bonds are equivalent, so mononitration does not give isomers (unlike the case of n-hexane).

Hazards
Nitrocyclohexane is highly flammable and a strong oxidizing agent. It is listed as an extremely hazardous substance by the Emergency Planning and Community Right-to-Know Act, and the NOAA warns that it can be explosive.

References

Further reading
 
 

Poisons
Nitro compounds
Cyclohexyl compounds
Convulsants